Andrés Rodríguez is the name of:

Andrés Rodríguez (politician) (1923–1997), president of Paraguay
Andrés Rodríguez (basketball) (born 1981), basketball player from Puerto Rico
Andrés Rodríguez (chess player), chess grandmaster from Uruguay, in FIDE World Chess Championship 1999
Andrés Rodríguez (cyclist), Colombian road cyclist in the Colombian National Time Trial Championships
Andres Rodriguez (show jumper) (1984–2016), Venezuelan showjumper
Andrés Rodríguez (athlete) (born 1985), Panamanian sprinter
Andrés Rodríguez Vila (born 1973), Uruguayan chess player